The Cape golden mole (Chrysochloris asiatica) is a small, insectivorous mammal of the family Chrysochloridae, the golden moles. The species is a solitary subterranean insectivore, confined to the coastal regions of the southwestern and southern Cape in South Africa. When foraging for soil invertebrates, these golden moles excavate superficial burrows using their conical nose shield and highly modified forefeet. Females are smaller than males. Golden moles have very dense, soft, and silky coats. The coats are colored blackish to slaty-grey and brown to pale fawn. They have also been observed to venture onto sandy beaches, presumably to feed on amphipods and isopods occurring there.

References

External links
Manyeleti Private Game Reserve - description of golden moles
 

Endemic fauna of South Africa
Afrosoricida
Mammals of South Africa
Least concern biota of Africa
Mammals described in 1758
Taxa named by Carl Linnaeus